The 2009–10 season was Associazione Sportiva Roma's 77th season in Serie A. The club competed in Serie A, the Coppa Italia, and the UEFA Europa League. Roma finished second in Serie A with 80 points, two points behind Inter.

In the previous season, Roma achieved sixth place in Serie A and qualified for the 2009–10 UEFA Europa League starting from the third qualifying round.

Players

Squad information
Last updated on 16 May 2010
Appearances include league matches only

Transfers

In

Out

Competitions

Overall

Last updated: 16 May 2010

Serie A

League table

Results summary

Results by round

Matches

Coppa Italia

UEFA Europa League

Third qualifying round

Play-off round

Group stage

Knockout phase

Round of 32

Statistics

Appearances and goals

|-
! colspan=14 style="background:#B21B1C; color:#FFD700; text-align:center"| Goalkeepers

|-
! colspan=14 style="background:#B21B1C; color:#FFD700; text-align:center"| Defenders

|-
! colspan=14 style="background:#B21B1C; color:#FFD700; text-align:center"| Midfielders

|-
! colspan=14 style="background:#B21B1C; color:#FFD700; text-align:center"| Forwards

|-
! colspan=14 style="background:#B21B1C; color:#FFD700; text-align:center"| Players transferred out during the season

Goalscorers

Last updated: 16 May 2010

Clean sheets

Last updated: 16 May 2010

Disciplinary record

Last updated:

References

A.S. Roma seasons
Roma